Dr. V. G Patel is the founder director of the Entrepreneurship Development Institute of India.

Dr. V G Patel was an inspiration for many entrepreneurs in his lifetime.

Dr. V G Patel died on April 4, 2019. He is author of The Seven Business Crisis & How to Beat Them (reissued as When the Going gets Tough), Managing India's Small Industrial Economy (with V. Padmanand), and Entrepreneurship Development Programme in India and its Relevance to Developing Countries.

He was awarded Padma Shri in 2017.

References

Living people
Indian business writers
Recipients of the Padma Shri in literature & education
Year of birth missing (living people)